Love Is the Song We Sing: San Francisco Nuggets 1965–1970 is the fourth Nuggets box set released by Rhino Records. It was released in 2007 and packaged as an 8 1/2 x 11" 120 page hardcover book, the first 73 pages of which were made up mostly of vintage photographs. The compilation focuses on San Francisco Sound bands. Its title is derived from the first line of "Get Together," two versions of which open (Dino Valenti) and close (The Youngbloods) the four-disc set.

Track listing

Disc one: "Seismic Rumbles"
"Let's Get Together" - Dino Valenti – 3:00
"I Feel Like I'm Fixin' to Die Rag" - Country Joe & The Fish – 2:43
"You Were on My Mind" - We Five – 2:36
"Number One" - The Charlatans – 4:06
"Can't Come Down" - The Warlocks – 3:01
"Don't Talk to Strangers" - The Beau Brummels – 2:20
"Anything" - The Vejtables – 1:58
"It's No Secret" - Jefferson Airplane – 2:30
"Johnny Was a Good Boy" - The Mystery Trend – 2:37
"Free Advice" - The Great Society – 2:06
"Mr. Jones (Ballad of a Thin Man)" - The Grass Roots – 2:55
"Stranger in a Strange Land" - Blackburn & Snow – 2:30
"Who Do You Love?" - Quicksilver Messenger Service – 5:56
"She's My Baby" - The Mojo Men – 3:01
"Coffee Cup" - Wildflower – 2:18
"Live Your Own Life" - Family Tree – 2:54
"Fat City" - Sons of Champlin – 3:04
"Human Monkey" - Frantics – 2:09
"Bye Bye Bye" - The Tikis – 2:46
"Section 43" - Country Joe & the Fish – 6:44
"Hello Hello" - Sopwith Camel – 2:25

Disc two: "Suburbia"
"Psychotic Reaction" - Count Five
"Got Love" - The Front Line
"Satisfaction Guaranteed" - The Mourning Reign
"Foolish Woman" - The Oxford Circle
"My Buddy Sin" - The Stained Glass
"Streetcar" - The Otherside
"Suzy Creamcheese" - Teddy and His Patches
"Rubiyat" - The Immediate Family
"Rumors" - Syndicate of Sound
"Sometimes I Wonder" - Harbinger Complex
"Want Ad Reader" - The New Breed
"I'm a Good Woman" - The Generation
"No Way Out" - The Chocolate Watch Band
"Hey I'm Lost" - Butch Engle & The Styx
"I Love You" - People!
"America" - Public Nuisance
"Fly To New York" - Country Weather
"Thing In 'E'" - The Savage Resurrection
"Hearts to Cry" - Frumious Bandersnatch

Disc three: "Summer of Love"
"Alabama Bound" - The Charlatans
"Carl Street" - The Mystery Trend
"Somebody to Love" - The Great Society
"Superbird" - Country Joe and the Fish
"Two Days 'Til Tomorrow" - The Beau Brummels
"Omaha" - Moby Grape
"Up & Down" - The Serpent Power
"The Golden Road (To Unlimited Devotion)" - Grateful Dead
"Codine" - Quicksilver Messenger Service
"Down On Me" - Big Brother and the Holding Company
"Think Twice" - Salvation
"White Rabbit" - Jefferson Airplane
"Roll With It" - Steve Miller Band
"Why Did You Put Me On" - Notes From The Underground
"Underdog" - Sly & The Family Stone
"Summertime Blues" - Blue Cheer
"Glue" - The Ace of Cups
"Soul Sacrifice" - Santana
"The Bells" - The Loading Zone

Disc four: "The Man Can't Bust Our Music"
"Evil Ways" - Santana
"Red the Sign Post" - Fifty Foot Hose
"Lemonaide Kid" - Kak
"1982-A" - Sons of Champlin
"How Can I Miss You When You Won't Go Away?" - Dan Hicks & His Hot Licks
"Amphetamine Gazelle" - Mad River
"Quicksilver Girl" - Steve Miller Band
"Revolution" - Mother Earth
"Murder in My Heart for the Judge" - Moby Grape
"Light Your Windows" - Quicksilver Messenger Service
"I'm Drowning" - The Flamin' Groovies
"Portrait of the Artist as a Young Lady" - Seatrain
"White Bird" - It's a Beautiful Day
"Dark Star" - Grateful Dead
"Fool" - Blue Cheer
"Mexico" - Jefferson Airplane
"Mercedes Benz" - Janis Joplin
"Get Together" - The Youngbloods

See also
 Nuggets (series)
 Hallucinations: Psychedelic Pop Nuggets from the WEA Vaults
 Come to the Sunshine: Soft Pop Nuggets from the WEA Vaults
 Where the Action Is! Los Angeles Nuggets 1965–1968

References

Nuggets series albums
Regional music compilation albums
2007 compilation albums
Psychedelic rock compilation albums
Folk rock compilation albums
Music of the San Francisco Bay Area